Repertorio Español was founded in 1968 by Producer Gilberto Zaldívar and Artistic Director René Buch to introduce the best of Latin American, Spanish, and Hispanic American theater to broad-ranging audiences in New York City and around the country. Robert Weber Federico joined the company two years later as Resident Designer and Associate Artistic Producer and is currently the organization's Executive Director.

History
In 1972, Repertorio Español moved to the Gramercy Arts Theatre where the company has since remained. The critical success of the company's first production, Who's Afraid of Virginia Woolf? set the stage for years of admiration by English and Spanish newspaper critics and the company's audiences.

From its earliest days, Repertorio has maintained a dramatic ensemble, attracting many talented veterans and emerging Hispanic actors, including Yolanda Arenas and Ofelia González, who was the first actress to win an Obie Award without having performed in English. Another addition was Pilar Rioja in 1973, marking the beginning of a relationship that has established Ms. Rioja as a legend in Spanish Dance. In 1980, Musical Director Pablo Zinger initiated a musical ensemble that presented zarzuelas, operas, and elegant musical anthologies.

In 1984, the company began to present and commission new plays by Hispanic American playwrights, and in 1991 it inaugurated an infrared simultaneous translation system that provides an opportunity for non-Spanish-speaking audiences to enjoy the company's vast selection of plays.

More recently, Repertorio presented the world premiere in Spanish of Nilo Cruz's Pulitzer Prize-winning drama Ana en el trópico (Anna in the Tropics). The play's cast included celebrities such as Spanish TV soap opera star Francisco Gattorno and Denise Quiñones (Miss Universe 2001).

Repertorio Español received the 2011 OBIE Award for Lifetime Achievement; a 1996 Drama Desk Special Award for presenting quality theater; a 1996 Obie Award for the play series Voces nuevas (New Voices); the New York State Governor's Award; as well as many citations by the Asociación de Cronistas de Espectáculos (ACE) and the Hispanic Organization of Latin Actors (HOLA).

Works or publications

Notes and references

Further reading

External links

 The Repertorio Español records are available at the Cuban Heritage Collection, University of Miami Libraries. This archival collection contains audiovisual materials from the Repertorio Español theater company, including DVDs with television commercials; media coverage; and excerpts, scenes, and full performances, as well as materials not related to theater. The collection also consists of fundraising records, show files, photographs, clippings, programs, scrapbooks documenting the operation of the theater, as well as audio and video cassettes.
 Repertorio Español website
 Creator page for Repertorio Español in the Cuban Theater Digital Archive.

Theatre companies in New York City
Hispanic and Latino American culture in New York City